In My Dreams is the debut album released by the Military Wives, originally a choir of women who rose to public prominence in 2011 when they featured in the fourth series of the BBC TV series The Choir, presented by choirmaster Gareth Malone.

The album features choral arrangements for 5 Military Wives' choirs from Plymouth, Chivenor, Portsmouth, CTCRM Lympstone and Catterick Garrison.  Featuring a number of hit singles including Bob Dylan's "Make You Feel My Love", U2's "With or Without You", and Coldplay's "Fix You". It also includes the Military Wives' 2011 Christmas Number One hit, "Wherever You Are", composed by Paul Mealor. The title track, "In My Dreams", also composed by Mealor, features the voice of Jonjo Kerr, a previous contestant in the television music competition The X Factor. The success of the TV series and the creation of the new choirs that feature on the album was the beginning of the formation of the Military Wives Choirs Foundation to whom £1 from the sale of each album will go to further their aims of creating a social support network across the UK for Military Wives through the medium of song.

Track listing

Charts

Weekly charts

Year-end charts

Release history

References

Decca Records albums
2012 debut albums
Military Wives albums